Tobins River, a perennial stream of the Hastings River catchment, is located in the Northern Tablelands and Mid North Coast districts of New South Wales, Australia.

Course and features
Tobins River rises below Mount Seaview, on the south-eastern slopes of the Great Dividing Range within Cotton Bimbang National Park, near the village of Myrtle Scrub, and flows generally east southeast, before reaching its confluence with the Hastings River, west of Birdwood. The river descends  over its  course.

See also

 Rivers of New South Wales
 List of rivers of New South Wales (L-Z)
 List of rivers of Australia

References

External links
 

Rivers of New South Wales
Mid North Coast
Northern Tablelands
Walcha Shire